Mansour F. Armaly (February 25, 1927 – August 19, 2005) was a Palestinian-American physician who researched the modern medical treatment of glaucoma.

Early life and education
Armaly was born in Shefa Amr, Palestine. He received his B.A. (1947) and M.D. (1951) from the American University of Beirut in Lebanon. After completing his residency in Beirut at the American University Hospital, he left in 1955 to attend the University of Iowa, from which he received the M.Sc. in 1957.  Armaly became an American citizen and joined the university's faculty, where he remained for thirteen years.

In 1970, he accepted a position as professor and chairman of the Department of Ophthalmology at the George Washington University Medical Center, in Washington, D.C., serving in that role for 27 years, until 1996.  From 1980 to 1987, Armaly served as President of the Pan-American Glaucoma Society.

Death
He died of cancer at the hospital where he had long worked at the age of 78.

He was survived by his wife of 55 years, Aida Armaly, and his two children, Fareed Armaly, an artist in Berlin, and Raya Armaly Harrison, an ophthalmologist in Columbia, Maryland.

Legacy
Armaly was a member of the University of Iowa Department of Ophthalmology faculty from 1958–1970.

The Lecture Recipients have been nominated since 2004: 2004 Robert N. Weinreb, MD; 2005 David L. Epstein, MD; 2006 Richard L. Abbott, MD; 2007 M. Bruce Shields, MD; 2008 Michael A. Kass, MD

Selection of scholar publications
The cup-disc ratio. The findings of tonometry and tonography in the normal eye, Arch Ophthalmol. 1969 Aug;82(2):191-6, Armaly MF, Sayegh RE
GENETIC FACTORS RELATED TO GLAUCOMA, Annals of the New York Academy of Sciences, Volume 151 Issue 1, Pages 861 – 874, Mansour F. Armaly
The Effect of Pilocarpine Ocusert With Different Release Rates on Ocular Pressure, Investigative Ophthalmology and Visual Science. 1973;12:491–496, Mansour F. Armaly and K. R. RAO
The Des Momes population Study of Glaucoma, Investigative Ophthalmology and Visual Science. 1962;1:618–628, Mansour F. Armaly

References and external links

further Obituaries:
 "Glaucoma Researcher Mansour F. Armaly, 78, Dies," Washington Post, August 25, 2005.
 American-Arab Anti-Discrimination Committee Obituary

American ophthalmologists
Palestinian medical researchers
Palestinian emigrants to the United States
Arab American
 
 
 
American people of Lebanese descent
People from Shefa-'Amr
University of Iowa alumni
American University of Beirut alumni
University of Iowa faculty
George Washington University faculty
1927 births
2005 deaths
Deaths from cancer in Washington, D.C.